Events from the year 2019 in Canada.

Incumbents

The Crown
 Monarch – Elizabeth II

Federal government
Governor General – Julie Payette
Prime Minister – Justin Trudeau
Parliament – 42nd (until 11 September), then 43rd (from 5 December)

Provincial governments

Lieutenant Governors
Lieutenant Governor of Alberta – Lois Mitchell
Lieutenant Governor of British Columbia – Janet Austin
Lieutenant Governor of Manitoba – Janice Filmon
Lieutenant Governor of New Brunswick – 
Jocelyne Roy-Vienneau (until August 2) 
vacant (August 2 to September 8) 
Brenda Murphy (since September 8)
Lieutenant Governor of Newfoundland and Labrador – Judy Foote
Lieutenant Governor of Nova Scotia – Arthur LeBlanc
Lieutenant Governor of Ontario – Elizabeth Dowdeswell
Lieutenant Governor of Prince Edward Island – Antoinette Perry
Lieutenant Governor of Quebec – J. Michel Doyon
Lieutenant Governor of Saskatchewan – 
W. Thomas Molloy (until July 2)
vacant (July 2 to 18)
Russell Mirasty (since July 18)

Premiers
Premier of Alberta – Rachel Notley (until April 30), then Jason Kenney
Premier of British Columbia – John Horgan
Premier of Manitoba – Brian Pallister
Premier of New Brunswick – Blaine Higgs
Premier of Newfoundland and Labrador – Dwight Ball
Premier of Nova Scotia – Stephen McNeil
Premier of Ontario – Doug Ford
Premier of Prince Edward Island – Wade MacLauchlan (until May 9), then Dennis King
Premier of Quebec – François Legault
Premier of Saskatchewan – Scott Moe

Territorial governments

Commissioners
Commissioner of Nunavut – Nellie Kusugak
Commissioner of the Northwest Territories – Margaret Thom
Commissioner of Yukon – Angélique Bernard

Premiers
Premier of Nunavut – Joe Savikataaq
Premier of the Northwest Territories – Bob McLeod (until October 24), then Caroline Cochrane
Premier of Yukon – Sandy Silver

Events

January
 January 5 – Finland won the gold medal match of the 2019 World Junior Ice Hockey Championships (which began 26 December 2018).
 January 11 – A double-decker bus accident OC Transpo struck a bus shelter killing three people and injuring 23 others in Ottawa.
 January 13 to 30 – The 2019 Canadian Figure Skating Championships were held.
 January 22 – A CN Rail train derailed at a level crossing on Saskatchewan Highway 11 north of Saskatoon.  Nobody was hurt.  There was significant damage to the train and crossing.

February–March
 February 15 to March 3 – 2019 Canada Winter Games in Red Deer.
 March 10 – Daylight saving time starts
 March 16 to 17 – Juno Awards of 2019 in London
 March 18 – Proceedings of the Senate of Canada were televised for the first time in the chamber's history.
 March 30 to April 7 – 2019 World Men's Curling Championship in Lethbridge

April–May
 April 16 – Alberta general election held. United Conservatives win a majority government, defeating New Democrats.
 April 23 – Prince Edward Island general election held. The Progressive Conservative Party wins a minority government, the Green Party will form the official opposition.
 May 15 – The 2019 Canadian Championship began. They are to be held till September 25, 2019.
 May 16 – Newfoundland and Labrador general election held. The Liberal Party retains power but with a minority government.
 May 17 to 26 – 2019 Memorial Cup held in Halifax

June–July
June 13 – The Toronto Raptors win their first NBA championship in the 2019 NBA Finals, the first time a Canadian team had won the NBA championship.
 June 17  –  Quebec passed Bill 21, a law which bars public servants from wearing religious symbols while on duty.
 July 9 – 
 The Crucifix in the National Assembly of Quebec that Quebec Premier Maurice Duplessis hung there in 1936 (83 years), is removed.
46 people were sent to the hospital after a serious carbon monoxide leak at a Super 8 motel in Winnipeg.  There were no fatalities.
 July 14 to July 19 – 2019 Northern British Columbia murders
 July 31 – Canada withdrew its peacekeeping forces from Mali.

August–September
August 7 – Bodies believed to be the suspects of the Northern British Columbia murders are found in dense brush near the Nelson River.
August 11 – Bianca Andreescu wins the 2019 Rogers Cup in the women's singles event after Serena Williams retires the match due to an upper back injury. This is the first time a Canadian has won the event since 1969.
August 31 – Contracts for Ontario teachers and education workers expires
September 10 – Manitoba general election held. The Progressive Conservative Party wins a second majority government.
September 19 – Photos and a video of blackface from 2001 of Prime Minister Justin Trudeau are released. Trudeau later apologizes for the photos and the video.

October–November
October 1 – Northwest Territories general election was held
October 21 – The 2019 Canadian federal election was held, with the Liberal Party forming a minority government.
November 3 – Daylight saving time ends
November 11 – Longtime hockey analyst Don Cherry is fired from Hockey Night in Canada, by Sportsnet.
November 23 – Calgary Dinos win the Vanier Cup, in Quebec City.
November 24 – Winnipeg Blue Bombers win the Grey Cup, in Calgary.
November 25 – 2019 World Ringette Championships in Burnaby, British Columbia.

December
December 9 – Bianca Andreescu awarded the 2019 Lou Marsh Trophy
December 12 – Andrew Scheer announces pending resignation as leader of the Conservative Party.

Deaths

January

3 January
 William Miller, football player (born 1957)
 Marcelle Corneille administrator and educator (born 1923)
4 January
 Peter Doucette, politician (born 1954)
 Frank Mugglestone, 94, English rugby league footballer (Bradford Northern, Castleford).
Norman Snider, screenwriter (born 1945)
5 January
 Jean-Eudes Dubé, politician (born 1926)
 Gerry Plamondon, ice hockey player (born 1924)
 Alexis Smirnoff, wrestler (born 1947)
 Myron Thompson, politician (born 1936)
6 January 
 George Crowe, ice hockey coach (born 1936)
 Gene Zwozdesky, politician (born 1948)
9 January
 Pierre de Bané, senator (born 1938)
 Paul Koslo, actor (born 1944)
11 January
 Mark Elliot, radio host (born 1953)
 Marge Callaghan, baseball player (born 1921)
12 January
 George Ball, entomologist (born 1926)
 Dennis Marvin Ham, politician (born 1941)
13 January – Bo Westlake, rower (born 1927)
14 January – Gavin Smith poker player(born 1968)
16 January
 Jean Chatillon, composer (born 1937)
 Alfred Kunz, composer (born 1929)
18 January
 Walter Craig, mathematician (born 1953)
 Gilles Paquet, economist (born 1936)
 François Protat, cinematographer
19 January – Red Sullivan, ice hockey player (born 1929)
22 January – A. Brian Deer, librarian (born 1945)
23 January – Jim McKean, Major League Baseball umpire (born 1945)
25 January – Jacques Berthelet, Roman Catholic bishop (born 1934)
29 January – Andy Hebenton, ice hockey player (born 1929)
31 January
 Ron Joyce, businessman, co-founder of Tim Hortons (born 1930)
 William Winegard, politician (born 1924)

February

1 February – Raymond Ratzlaff, politician (born 1931)
2 February
 Michael Ferguson, Auditor General of Canada (born 1958)
 William Slater, swimmer (born 1940)
4 February – Phil Western, musician (born 1971)
6 February – Paul Dewar, educator and politician from Ottawa (born 1963)
10 February – Michael Wilson, politician (born 1937)
11 February
 James Burns, businessman
 Joe Schlesinger, television journalist, and author (born 1928)
15 February – Erminie Cohen, senator (born 1926)
16 February – Albert Ludwig, politician and author (born 1919)
18 February – Charles Deblois, politician (born 1939)
23 February – Bob Adams, decathlete (born 1924)
24 February – Trevor Eyton, senator and businessman (born 1934)
25 February – Chantal duPont, multidisciplinary artist (born 1942)
27 February – Sandra Faire, television producer and philanthropist
28 February – Ed Bickert, jazz guitarist (born 1932)

March

 March 1 – Elly Mayday, model and women's health advocate (born 1988)
 March 4
 Robert Wagner Dowling, politician (born 1924)
 Art Hughes, Canadian soccer player (born 1930)
 Ted Lindsay, professional ice hockey player (born 1925)
 March 5
 Richard Allen, politician (born 1929)
 Stephen Irwin, architect (born 1939)
 March 6
 Gordon Osbaldeston, civil servant (born 1930)
 Charlie Panigoniak, Inuktitut singer and guitarist (born 1946)
 March 7 – Patrick Lane, poet (born 1939)
 March 9 – Harry Howell, ice hockey player (born 1932)
 March 11 – Joe Rosenblatt, poet (born 1933)
 March 16 – Joe Fafard, sculptor (born 1942)

April
 April 3 – Mary Borgstrom, potter and ceramist (born 1916
 April 7 – Wilbert Keon, physician and senator (born 1935)
 April 19 – William Krehm, author, journalist, political activist and real estate developer (born 1913)
 April 28 – Wayson Choy, writer (born 1939)

May

 May 2 
 Red Kelly, ice hockey player and politician (born 1927)
 Murray Thomson, activist (born 1922)
 May 23 – Mike Laffin, politician and dentist (born 1918)

June
 June 20 – Mark Warawa, politician (born 1950)
 June 30 – John Rafferty, politician (born 1953)

July
 July 2 – W. Thomas Molloy, 22nd Lieutenant Governor of Saskatchewan
 July 7 – Edna Anderson, politician. (born 1922)
 July 8 – Greg Johnson, ice hockey player (b. 1971)

August
 August 2 
 Jocelyne Roy-Vienneau, 31st Lieutenant Governor of New Brunswick (b. 1955/1956)
 Deepak Obhrai, Canadian Member of Parliament for Calgary Forest Lawn (b. 1950)
 August 19 – Bette Stephenson, physician and politician (born 1924)

September
 September 17 – Harvey Wylie, gridiron football player (born 1933)
 September 18 – Graeme Gibson, writer (born 1934)
 September 20 – Rick Bognar, wrestler (born 1970)

October
 October 7 – Devan Bracci-Selvey, school student and murder victim (born 2005)
 October 9 – Anne Hart, writer (born 1935)
 October 30 – Bernard Slade, playwright (born 1930)

December
 December 11 – Fernande Saint-Martin, art critic, museologist, semiologist, visual arts theorist and writer (born 1927)
 December 24 – Kelly Fraser, Inuk pop singer and songwriter (born 1993)

See also

 2019 Canadian federal election
 2019 in Canadian television
 List of Canadian films of 2019

References

External links
 

 
2010s in Canada
Years of the 21st century in Canada
Canada